The Foundations for Evidence-Based Policymaking Act (Evidence Act) is a United States law that establishes processes for the federal government to modernize its data management practices, evidence-building functions, and statistical efficiency to inform policy decisions. The Evidence Act contains four parts ("titles"), which address evidence capacity, open data (OPEN Government Data Act), and data confidentiality (the reauthorization of the Confidential Information Protection and Statistical Efficiency Act).

Legislative history 
The bill was introduced in the U.S. House of Representatives by former House Speaker Paul Ryan of Wisconsin on October 31, 2017. Senator Patty Murray filed counterpart legislation in the U.S. Senate. Rep. Ryan and Sen. Murray acknowledged that the basis of the legislation was a set of recommendations issued by the U.S. Commission on Evidence-Based Policymaking. The Evidence Act addresses half of the recommendations from that commission. 

In November 2017, the House Committee on Oversight and Government Reform advanced the bill, which was approved unanimously by the full House. The Senate advanced a modified version of the bill in December 2018, which returned to the House for a final vote. The U.S. president signed the bill into law on January 14, 2019.

See also
 Open data in the United States
 U.S. Commission on Evidence-Based Policymaking, est. March 2016

Notes

References

Further reading

External links
 Foundations for Evidence-Based Policymaking Act of 2018 (PDF/details) as amended in the GPO Statute Compilations collection
 H.R.4174 - Foundations for Evidence-Based Policymaking Act of 2018 bill information on Congress.gov
 GSA Technology Transformation Services. Draft 2019-2020 Federal Data Strategy Action Plan
 Data Coalition. OPEN Government Data Act (assorted info from advocacy group supporting machine-readable data)
 Office of Mgmt. & Budget, Exec. Office of the President, OMB Mem. No. M-19-23, Phase 1 Implementation of the Foundations for Evidence-Based Policymaking Act of 2018: Learning Agendas, Personnel, and Planning Guidance (2019), https://www.whitehouse.gov/wp-content/uploads/2019/07/M-19-23.pdf
 Office of Mgmt. & Budget, Exec. Office of the President, OMB Mem. No M-13-13, Open Data Policy---Managing Information as an Asset (2013), https://obamawhitehouse.archives.gov/sites/default/files/omb/memoranda/2013/m-13-13.pdf

Acts of the 115th United States Congress
Data laws of the Americas
Open government in the United States